Sant'Angelo (Italian lit. 'holy angel') is an Italian name for the Archangel Michael.

It may also refer to:

Religion
Sant'Angelo, the Italian name for Saint Angelus of Jerusalem
 Roman Catholic Diocese of Santo Ângelo, a Roman Catholic Diocese of Brazil

Localities

Brazil
Santo Ângelo, a city in Rio Grande do Sul state
Santo Ângelo (micro-region), a micro-region in Rio Grande do Sul state

Italy
Municipalities (comuni)
Castel Sant'Angelo, in the province of Rieti
Città Sant'Angelo, in the province of Pescara 
Monte Sant'Angelo, in the province of Foggia 
Mosciano Sant'Angelo, in the province of Teramo 
Sant'Angelo a Cupolo, in the province of Benevento 
Sant'Angelo a Fasanella, in the province of Salerno 
Sant'Angelo a Scala, in the province of Avellino 
Sant'Angelo all'Esca, in the province of Avellino 
Sant'Angelo d'Alife, in the province of Caserta 
Sant'Angelo dei Lombardi, in the province of Avellino 
Sant'Angelo del Pesco, in the province of Isernia 
Sant'Angelo di Brolo, in the province of Messina 
Sant'Angelo di Piove di Sacco, in the province of Padua
Sant'Angelo Le Fratte, in the province of Potenza 
Sant'Angelo in Lizzola, in the province of Pesaro and Urbino 
Sant'Angelo in Pontano, in the province of Macerata 
Sant'Angelo in Vado, in the province of Pesaro e Urbino 
Sant'Angelo Limosano, in the province of Campobasso 
Sant'Angelo Lodigiano, in the province of Lodi 
Sant'Angelo Lomellina, in the province of Pavia 
Sant'Angelo Muxaro, in the province of Agrigento 
Sant'Angelo Romano, in the province of Rome 
Valle dell'Angelo, in the province of Salerno 
Villa Sant'Angelo, in the province of L'Aquila

Buildings, districts and roads of Rome
 Borgo Sant'Angelo, a road in the Roman rione of Borgo
 Castel Sant'Angelo, a castle in Rome
 Sant'Angelo (rione of Rome), a rione of the City of Rome
 Teatro San Angelo, a theatre in Venice, which ran from 1677 until 1803

 Civil parishes (frazioni)
Sant'Angelo, Campania, in the municipality of Campagna in the Province of Salerno
Sant'Angelo, Emilia-Romagna, in the municipality of Gatteo in the Province of Forli-Cesena
Sant'Angelo, Rieti, in the municipality of Amatrice in the Province of Rieti, Lazio
Sant'Angelo a Lecore, in the municipalities of Campi Bisenzio (FI) and Signa (FI) 
Sant'Angelo di Roccalvecce, in the municipality of Viterbo 
Sant'Angelo in Formis, in the municipality of Capua (CE) 
Sant'Angelo in Macerata, in the municipality of Mercato San Severino (SA) 
Sant'Angelo in Theodice, in the municipality of Cassino (FR) 
Sant'Angelo in Trigillo, in the municipality of Leonessa (RI)

 Mountains, lakes and islands
Sant'Angelo della Polvere, an island of Venetian Lagoon

Greece
 Castel Sant'Angelo, the Venetian name for Angelokastro (Corfu) castle

See also
Santangelo (disambiguation)
Angelo (disambiguation)
Angel (disambiguation)
San Angelo, Texas, city in the United States